San Mauro Marchesato is a town with a population of 2002 people in the province of Crotone, in Calabria, Italy. It is in the centre of Marchesato.

References

San Mauro Marcesato